The Library of Congress is the research library that officially serves the United States Congress and is the de facto national library of the United States.

Library of Congress may also refer to:

 Library of Congress (film), a 1945 documentary film about the Library of Congress
 Law Library of Congress, the law library of the United States Congress
 Library of Congress Building, a building in Washington, D.C. and former location of the Library of Congress.
 Library of Congress of Chile, a library in Santiago, Chile
 Library of the Congress of Mexico, a library containing records of Mexico's legislative sessions
 Library of the Congress of the Republic of Colombia, a library in the Republic of Columbia
 Library of Congress Classification, a system of library classification developed by the Library of Congress

See also 

 Librarian of Congress
 List of national and state libraries